Daan Huizing (born 22 October 1990) is a Dutch professional golfer.

Huizing entered the European Tour qualifying school at the end of 2012.  Because of his high ranking as an amateur, he was exempt from the first stage of qualifying.  He made it through to the third stage where he finished 80th, earning a place in some Challenge Tour events for 2013.

Huizing won twice in 2013, at the Northern Ireland Open Challenge and two weeks later at the Kharkov Superior Cup. He was also joint runner-up in the Kärnten Golf Open and finished the year in sixth place in the Challenge Tour standings, and graduated to the European Tour for 2014. Huizing had a disappointing 2014 with best finishes of tied for 12th place.

Since 2015 Huizing has mostly played on the Challenge Tour. Until 2021 his best finishes were joint runner-up finishes in the 2015 Cordon Golf Open and the 2017 Viking Challenge. In 2019 Huizing won the Jordan Mixed Open, a mixed event that included players from the Challenge Tour, the European Senior Tour and the Ladies European Tour. In 2021 he won the Irish Challenge on the Challenge Tour, beating Eduard Rousaud in a sudden-death playoff.

Amateur wins

2010 Netherlands National Match Play
2011 National Stroke Play (Netherlands), German International Amateur, BrabantsOpen/Zomerwedstrijid, Turkish Amateur Open, Copa Juan Carlos Tailhade, Argentine Amateur Championship
2012 Lytham Trophy, St Andrews Links Trophy

Source:

Professional wins (6)

Challenge Tour wins (3)

Challenge Tour playoff record (2–0)

Other wins (3)
2010 Dutch National Open Championship (as an amateur) 
2012 Dutch National Open Championship (as an amateur)
2019 Jordan Mixed Open

Team appearances
Amateur

 European Boys' Team Championship (representing the Netherlands): 2007, 2008

European Amateur Team Championship (representing the Netherlands): 2010
Eisenhower Trophy (representing the Netherlands): 2010, 2012
Bonallack Trophy (representing Europe): 2012 (winners)
Palmer Cup (representing Europe): 2012 (winners)

Professional
World Cup (representing the Netherlands): 2018

See also
2013 Challenge Tour graduates
2021 Challenge Tour graduates

References

External links

Dutch male golfers
European Tour golfers
Utrecht University alumni
Sportspeople from Zwolle
Sportspeople from Utrecht (province)
People from Soest, Netherlands
1990 births
Living people
21st-century Dutch people